Patriarch Gregory of Constantinople may refer to:

 Gregory I of Constantinople, Patriarch in 379–381
 Gregory II of Constantinople, Ecumenical Patriarch of Constantinople in 1283–1289
 Gregory III of Constantinople, Ecumenical Patriarch of Constantinople in 1443–1450
 Gregory IV of Constantinople, Ecumenical Patriarch of Constantinople in 1623
 Gregory V of Constantinople, Ecumenical Patriarch of Constantinople in 1797–1798, 1806–1808 and 1818–1821
 Gregory VI of Constantinople, Ecumenical Patriarch of Constantinople in 1835–1840
 Gregory VII of Constantinople, Ecumenical Patriarch of Constantinople in 1923–1924